Syrians in the United Arab Emirates include migrants from Syria to the United Arab Emirates, as well as their descendants. The number of Syrians in the United Arab Emirates was estimated to be around 242,000 in 2015. 

A large number of Syrians live in the UAE, many of whom have been in the country since the beginning of its prosperity, even before 1971. Syrian teachers and professors played an important role in the country's development. Syrians are highly educated and respected and are considered one of the most developed Arab diasporas in the UAE. 

In addition to being famous in the media, beauty, fashion, real estate and IT industries, many Syrians have developed their own companies and restaurants, as Syrian cuisine is known to be the richest kitchen in the Middle East and one of the most variable in the world. Syrians work in both the public and private sectors. Many higher positions are usually held by Syrians, or Emiratis of Syrian origin, due to their known education, diplomacy and background. Many Syrian artists and actors, who are considered to be the most famous in the Arab world, are living now in the UAE. 

Most Syrians reside in Abu Dhabi, Dubai, and a smaller number in Sharjah. In addition to Arabic, most Syrians speak English fluently and a smaller number of them speak French and other languages. Before the 2011 crisis, Syria was the first Arab destination for UAE citizens who considered it home. Most are Sunni Muslims and Christians.

See also
Syria–United Arab Emirates relations
Syrian diaspora
Expatriates in the United Arab Emirates

References

Arabs in the United Arab Emirates
United Arab Emirates
Ethnic groups in the United Arab Emirates
 
UAE